Vrazhdebna Air Base or 16th Transport Air Base is a military air base, located on the site of Sofia Airport. The air base functions as a hub for the 16th Transport Squadron of the BAF.

History 
"Vrazhdebna" is the original name for Sofia Airport, used since its establishment in 1937. The name is derived from the nearby village of Vrazhdebna (now a suburb of Sofia) and is literally translated as hostile.

Although various military transportation units, have been based at the airport since the late 1940s, it was not until 1994 when a separate military unit (16th Transport Air Base) was established. Both Sofia Airport and 16th TAB carry the official name "Vrazhdebna".

Units 
Until 1950 it was the hub for the 14th Air Transport Regiment, which included mostly German aircraft (Junkers Ju 52, Junkers A 35). After 1950 it was renamed to 16th Transport Squadron and was equipped with Lisunov Li-2 transport aircraft.

On some occasions Vrazhdebna Air Base also houses civilian Aviation Detachment 28 aircraft, which carry senior members of the Bulgarian government.

See also 
Dobroslavtsi Air Base
Cheshnegirovo Air Base
Gabrovnitsa Air Base
Uzundzhovo Air Base
Graf Ignatievo Air Base
Bezmer Air Base
Dobrich Air Base
Ravnets Air Base
Balchik Air Base
List of Bulgarian Air Force bases
The Bulgarian Cosmonauts
List of joint US-Bulgarian military bases

References 

Air force installations of Bulgaria